Washington County is a county located in the U.S. state of Tennessee. As of the 2020 census, the population was 133,001. Its county seat is Jonesborough. The county's largest city and a regional educational, medical and commercial center is Johnson City. Washington County is Tennessee's oldest county, having been established in 1777 when the state was still part of North Carolina. Washington County is part of the Johnson City, TN Metropolitan Statistical Area, which is a component of the Johnson City–Kingsport–Bristol, TN-VA Combined Statistical Area, commonly known as the "Tri-Cities" region.

History

Watauga and the Washington District
Washington County is rooted in the Watauga settlements, which were established in the early 1770s in the vicinity of what is now Elizabethton, in adjacent Carter County.  At the outbreak of the Revolutionary War in 1776, the Wataugans organized the "Washington District," which was governed by a committee of safety.  North Carolina initially refused to recognize the settlements as legal, but finally agreed to annex the district after the settlers thwarted an invasion by hostile Cherokees.  The settlements were governed as the Washington District, which originally included all of what is now Tennessee.  The district was reorganized as Washington County in 1777.

Washington County, North Carolina and Franklin
From 1777 until 1784, North Carolina held nominal control over the county, but did little for the residents, at least in their eyes. So the area citizens formed, in 1784, the State of Franklin to meet their needs.  Franklin was an early attempt to create a fourteenth state prior to Kentucky and Vermont's admissions into the union. The county reverted to North Carolina control, however, following the failure of the Franklin state government in 1788.

Part of Tennessee
In 1790 the area became part of Southwest Territory, and afterward it was admitted to the Union in 1796 as the 16th state.  Jonesboro, the county seat of Washington County, is Tennessee's oldest town.  With many buildings restored, it comprises one of the nation's most authentic historic districts of the period 1790–1870.

Washington County was divided between pro-Union and pro-secession sentiments at the outset of the Civil War.  In Tennessee's Ordinance of Secession referendum on June 8, 1861, Washington Countians voted 1,445 to 1,022 in favor of remaining in the Union.  One of the bridges targeted by the East Tennessee bridge-burners in November 1861 was located in what is now Watauga near the Washington-Carter county line.  Landon Carter Haynes, a Confederate senator, hailed from Washington County.

Johnson City, originally known as Johnson's Depot, was a major railway center for the southeastern states, connecting the region for freight transportation and passengers.  It was the headquarters for both the standard-gauge Carolina, Clinchfield, and Ohio (Clinchfield Railroad), which required the excavation and blasting of 17 tunnels during its construction; and the narrow-gauge East Tennessee and Western North Carolina Railroad (Tweetsie). Significant restoration is underway, as well as publicizing the railroad heritage of the Johnson's Depot Historic District.  Other historic properties are being restored as representative of Johnson City's late nineteenth and early twentieth-century era as a railway center.

Geography

The western portion of the county is situated in the Ridge-and-Valley Appalachians, which are characterized by long, narrow ridges roughly oriented northeast-to-southwest. The county's most prominent Ridge-and-Valley features rise in the vicinity of its northwestern border with Hawkins and Sullivan counties. The eastern portion of the county lies within the Blue Ridge Mountains, specifically the Bald Mountains (south of the Nolichucky River) and the Unaka Range (north of the Nolichucky). Buffalo Mountain,  a long ridge that straddles much of Washington's eastern boundary, contains the county's highest point,  Pinnacle Knob. The Cherokee National Forest protects much of the extreme eastern part of the county. Sampson Mountain, which rises in the southeastern part of the county, is home to a designated national wilderness area.

The Nolichucky River flows through the southern part of Washington County.  The Watauga River flows the northern part of the county, and forms part of the county's border with Sullivan County.  The lower section of the Watauga River is part of Boone Lake.

Adjacent counties
Sullivan County (north)
Carter County (east)
Unicoi County (south)
Greene County (west)
Hawkins County (northwest)

National protected area
Cherokee National Forest (part)

State protected areas

Chester Inn (state historic site)
Tipton-Haynes State Historic Site

Major Highways

Demographics

2020 census

As of the 2020 United States census, there were 133,001 people, 55,817 households, and 33,838 families residing in the county.

2000 census
As of the census of 2000, there were 107,198 people, 44,195 households, and 29,478 families residing in the county.  The population density was 328 people per square mile (127/km2).  There were 47,779 housing units at an average density of 146 per square mile (57/km2).  The racial makeup of the county was 93.72% White, 3.82% Black or African American, 0.24% Native American, 0.73% Asian, 0.02% Pacific Islander, 0.51% from other races, and 0.97% from two or more races.  1.38% of the population were Hispanic or Latino of any race.

There were 44,195 households, out of which 28.20% had children under the age of 18 living with them, 52.60% were married couples living together, 10.50% had a female householder with no husband present, and 33.30% were non-families. 27.80% of all households were made up of individuals, and 9.70% had someone living alone who was 65 years of age or older.  The average household size was 2.33 and the average family size was 2.85.

In the county, the population was spread out, with 21.30% under the age of 18, 10.80% from 18 to 24, 30.00% from 25 to 44, 24.00% from 45 to 64, and 13.90% who were 65 years of age or older.  The median age was 37 years. For every 100 females, there were 94.80 males.  For every 100 females age 18 and over, there were 91.70 males.

The median income for a household in the county was $33,116, and the median income for a family was $41,162. Males had a median income of $30,874 versus $21,485 for females. The per capita income for the county was $19,085.  About 10.20% of families and 13.90% of the population were below the poverty line, including 16.80% of those under age 18 and 14.20% of those age 65 or over.

Education

Elementary schools

Middle schools
 Boones Creek Middle School
Jonesborough Middle School. Built in 1950 as a high school. Became a middle school in 1971. Has approximately 500 students in grades 5–8.

High schools
Asbury Optional High School
Daniel Boone High School
David Crockett High School
Science Hill High School
University School

Communities

Cities
Johnson City (small portion in Carter County and Sullivan County)
Watauga (mostly in Carter County)

Town
Jonesborough (county seat)

Census-designated places
Fall Branch (partial)
Gray
Oak Grove
Spurgeon (partial)
Telford

Unincorporated communities

 Austin Springs
 Boone
 Boones Creek
 Bowmantown
 Bumpus Cove (partial)
 Embreeville
 February
 Lamar
 Limestone
 Midway
 Mountain Home
 South Central
 Stewart Hill
 Sulphur Springs
 Washington College

Notable residents

 Joseph Hardin, Sr. – Revolutionary War hero, and North Carolina militia colonel for the Western Counties, 1788;

Politics
Like most of East Tennessee, Washington County has been a Republican stronghold since the Civil War. No National Democratic candidate has won the county since 1856, though Lyndon Johnson came within 359 votes of Barry Goldwater in 1964 and Jimmy Carter came within 819 votes of Gerald Ford in 1976. Franklin Roosevelt is the only other Democrat to even cross the 40 percent mark. The only time the Republicans have failed to win the county since 1868, the first election it competed in Tennessee, came in 1912, when the Bull Moose Party divided the Republican vote and won a plurality.

See also
National Register of Historic Places listings in Washington County, Tennessee

References

External links

Official site
Washington County Schools 
Washington County TNGenWeb

 
1777 establishments in North Carolina
Populated places established in 1777
State of Franklin
Johnson City metropolitan area, Tennessee
Counties of Appalachia
Second Amendment sanctuaries in Tennessee
East Tennessee